Tak Jae-in is a South Korean voice actor. He joined the Munhwa Broadcasting Corporation's voice acting division in 1974.

Roles

Broadcast TV
Sonic (Korea TV Edition, MBC)
Inspector Gadget (Korea TV Edition, MBC)
Peterpan's Adventure (Korea TV Edition, MBC)

Broadcasting Radio
History 50 (MBC)

Movie dubbing
Lethal Weapon 3 (replacing Danny Glover, Korea TV Edition, MBC)
Pocheongcheon (Korea TV Edition, MBC)

See also
Munhwa Broadcasting Corporation

External links
MBC Voice Acting Division Tak Jae In Blog(in Korean)

South Korean male voice actors
Year of birth missing (living people)
Living people